Joshua Thomas Ward-Hibbert (born 25 January 1994) is a British basketball player for the London Lions of the British Basketball League (BBL). 

Best known for his former occupation as a tennis player. Ward-Hibbert holds the record for the fastest serve by a junior player at Wimbledon after clocking a 133 mph serve at the 2011 Wimbledon Championships. Ward-Hibbert, along with Liam Broady, won the 2012 Australian Open Boys' doubles title after defeating Adam Pavlasek and Filip Veger 6–3, 6–2 in 2012. 

In 2016, while studying at Loughborough University, Ward-Hibbert switched his attention from tennis to basketball, initially playing for the Derby Trailblazers. He transferred to the British Basketball League (BBL) club Leicester Riders during the 2016–17 BBL season. 

On 13 August, 2020, Ward-Hibbert signed with the London Lions for the 2020–21 BBL season.

Tennis career

Juniors

Junior Slam results – Singles:

Australian Open: QF (2012)
French Open: 1R (2012)
Wimbledon: 2R (2011)
US Open: 2R (2012)

Junior Slam results – Doubles:

Australian Open: W (2012)
French Open: QF (2012)
Wimbledon: QF (2011)
US Open: QF (2012)

ATP Challengers and ITF Futures finals

Singles: 1 (1–0)

Doubles: 27 (13–14)

Personal
Ward-Hibbert's infant and junior school was Dagfa House School a small independent school in Nottingham. Ward-Hibbert was an accomplished basketball player as a teenager, playing for the England under-16 team. In 2010, he was named the England under-16 boys' player of the year by England Basketball after being named to the All-Tournament team at the Division B European Championships.

References

External links

1994 births
Living people
Australian Open (tennis) junior champions
British male tennis players
English male tennis players
English men's basketball players
Grand Slam (tennis) champions in boys' doubles
Guards (basketball)
London Lions (basketball) players
Sportspeople from Nottingham
Tennis people from Nottinghamshire